Gina Glocksen (born July 4, 1984) is an American singer, who was the ninth-place finisher on the sixth season of American Idol. She was eliminated on April 4, 2007. She previously appeared in season 5. Glocksen is the first among the few contestants to have been eliminated in Hollywood round in an earlier season and then place in a later one.

Biography
She grew up in Tinley Park, Illinois, a southwest suburb of Chicago, and attended Virgil I. Grissom Jr. High School and Victor J. Andrew High School. Glocksen has been singing since age seven and she had classical music training in high school, where she learned to play the piano and flute. Glocksen tried out for the 5th season American Idol, but didn't make it to the Top 24.

Prior to her second audition for the 6th season of American Idol, Glocksen worked as a dental assistant in Worth, Illinois and also performed in the cover band Catfight.

She married science teacher/musician Joe Ruzicka on New Year's Eve 2008; Jordin Sparks served as one of her bridesmaids

American Idol
In Season 5, Glocksen auditioned in Chicago and sang "The Power of Love," which advanced her to Hollywood. In the first round of Hollywood auditions, Glocksen performed "If I Ever Fall In Love Again." She was eliminated on the final day of Hollywood auditions.

In Season 6, Glocksen had a second chance to audition on American Idol in Memphis. Her audition song was Black Velvet, and she made it again to Hollywood. During Hollywood week, she sang the song "Be My Baby" by the Ronettes, together with Perla Meneses, Jessica Gordon and Marisa Rhodes in group round. On the final day, she performed "Have You Ever Really Loved A Woman." Glocksen finally made into the Top 24, and then into the finals. She was voted off April 4, 2007, making her the ninth-place finalist. Like Chris Sligh and Stephanie Edwards before her, she was never in the bottom 3 or 2 until she was eliminated.

Performances during voting weeks

Post-Idol
Following her elimination, she appeared on Live with Regis and Kelly and The Ellen DeGeneres Show, where she performed "Alone" for Ellen. She also appeared on ME TV on Nickelodeon, although she did not sing.

After her duet with Phil Stacey during an Illinois show of the American Idols LIVE! Tour 2007, Gina's boyfriend of three years, Joe, appeared on stage and surprised her by proposing to her. Jordin Sparks and Haley Scarnato will reportedly serve as two of the eight bridesmaids at the wedding.

In season 7 of American Idol Gina worked as co-host on American Idol Extra together with Constantine Maroulis.

She is currently working on original material. One song 'When It Rains" has been performed on American Idol Extra.

Glocksen is playing shows in the Chicago area with her new band, The Gina Glocksen Band.

She has released on single, "Superhero" to iTunes on March 1, 2011, under a record label called "Wicked Lip Records."

EP
Glocksen has released an EP containing the four songs she sang while in the final 12 of American Idol, but it is no longer available for purchase on iTunes.

 "Love Child" : 3:05
 "Paint It Black" : 3:28
 "I'll Stand By You" : 4:03
 "Smile" : 2:46

References

External links
The Gina Glocksen Band Website

1984 births
Living people
21st-century American singers
American Idol participants
Singers from Illinois
People from Tinley Park, Illinois
Women rock singers
21st-century American women singers